= Infanzón, Catamarca =

Coordinates: 28°35′S 65°26′W

Infanzón
- Municipality and village
- Interactive map of Infanzón
- Country: Argentina
- Province: Catamarca Province
- Time zone: UTC−3 (ART)

Infanzón is a village and municipality in Catamarca Province in northwestern Argentina.
